Arno Pieter Poley (born 14 March 1991) is a South African professional rugby union player who most recently played with the . His regularly plays as a fullback or a winger.

Career

Youth

He was a member of the  side that played in the 2010 Under-19 Provincial Championship where he ended the season as the top scorer for the side, scoring one try and kicking thirteen conversions and seven penalties. He was also a member of the  sides that played in the Under-21 Provincial Championships in 2011 and 2012.

Falcons

Despite still being involved at Under-21 level until 2012, he played first class rugby for the  since 2011. It took him just over 20 minutes to appear on the scoresheet for the first time, scoring the Falcons' first try in a 55–19 defeat. He started six of the Falcons' eight matches during that competition and made one substitute appearance.

Poley's Currie Cup debut also came during 2011.

He remained a first team regular over the next few seasons, representing them in the Vodacom Cup and Currie Cup competitions.

References

1991 births
Living people
People from Barberton, Mpumalanga
South African rugby union players
Rugby union fullbacks
Rugby union wings
Falcons (rugby union) players
Rugby union players from Mpumalanga